The 2024 United States House of Representatives elections in North Carolina will be held on November 5, 2024, to elect the fourteen U.S. representatives from the State of North Carolina, one from all fourteen of the state's congressional districts. The elections will coincide with the 2024 U.S. presidential election, as well as other elections to the House of Representatives, elections to the United States Senate, and various state and local elections.

District 1

The 1st district includes Vance, Warren, Franklin, Halifax, Northampton, Nash, Wilson, Edgecombe, Greene, Martin, Bertie, Hertford, Gates, Chowan, Perquimans, Pasquotank, Washington, and Tyrell counties. It also includes the majority of Pitt County. The incumbent is Democrat Don Davis, who was elected with 52.4% of the vote in 2022.

Democratic primary

Candidates

Potential
Don Davis, incumbent U.S. Representative

General election

Predictions

District 6

The incumbent is Democrat Kathy Manning, who was re-elected with 53.9% of the vote in 2022.

Democratic primary

Candidates

Potential
Kathy Manning, incumbent U.S. Representative

Republican primary

Candidates

Filed paperwork
Christian Castelli, businessman, retired U.S. Army officer, and nominee in 2022

General election

Predictions

District 11

The incumbent is Republican Chuck Edwards, who was elected with 53.8% of the vote in 2022.

Republican primary

Candidates

Potential
 Chuck Edwards, incumbent U.S. Representative

General election

Predictions

District 13

This district includes all of Johnston County, the southern half of Wake County, the western half of Wayne County, and the eastern half of Harnett County. The incumbent is Democrat Wiley Nickel, who flipped the district and was elected with 51.3% of the vote in 2022. Nickel is running for re-election.

Democratic primary

Candidates

Declared
Wiley Nickel, incumbent U.S. Representative

Republican primary

Candidates

Filed paperwork
Bo Hines, law school student, former college football player, and nominee in 2022

Potential
Erin Paré, state representative

General election

Predictions

District 14

The incumbent is Democrat Jeff Jackson, who was elected with 57.7% of the vote in 2022.

Democratic primary

Candidates

Potential
Jeff Jackson, incumbent U.S. Representative

Republican primary

Candidates

Potential
Tim Moore, Speaker of the North Carolina House of Representatives

General election

Predictions

References

2024
North Carolina
United States House of Representatives